The 1990 Purefoods Hotdogs season was the 3rd season of the franchise in the Philippine Basketball Association (PBA).

Draft picks

Occurrences
In the first conference, the Hotdogs played their last four games without an import when the team decided to release their reinforcement Dwayne Johnson after a 120-138 loss to winless Pop Cola on March 13. They lost all their remaining matches and were fined by the PBA.

Former imports Daren Queenan and Walker Russell, who both played last season with Añejo and Presto respectively, were the Hotdogs imports for the Third Conference. After eight games with Purefoods carrying a 5-win, 3-loss slate, the management and coaching staff decided to replace Walker Russell in favor of Robert Paul Rose.

Notable dates
July 3: Purefoods upended a game Añejo Rum 65ers, 131-117, to moved up to second place behind unbeaten Presto Tivolis. Nelson Asaytono topscored for the Hotdogs with 29 points. 

July 24: The Hotdogs hang on to scuttle Presto, 120-113, snapping the Tivolis’ 10-game, unbeaten streak at the start of the semifinal round of the All-Filipino Conference. Dindo Pumaren fired the insurance basket from close range with 12 seconds remaining which gave the Hotdogs a safe 118-113 lead. Purefoods assumed solo second place with eight wins against three losses.  

August 12: Purefoods makes a return trip to the All-Filipino finals and shoved Presto Tivolis at second place by scoring a 116-107 victory with Glenn Capacio hitting 31 points.

3rd straight All-Filipino runner-up finish 
In the championship series against Presto Tivolis, the Hotdogs were slightly favored to end frustrations and win their first title, but the experience Presto lineup defied the odds by taking the crown in a seven-game series as Purefoods ended up bridesmaid for the fourth time.

First title
In the Third Conference, Purefoods made it to the championship round against Alaska Milkmen. The Hotdogs finally won their first PBA title in three years of participation by coming back from a 0-2 overhaul to win the best-of-five finals series, three games to two, sweeping the last three games to become the second team to pull the feat since the famed Crispa Redmanizers in 1976. Coach Baby Dalupan won his 15th league title and the Hotdogs' main man Alvin Patrimonio was voted finals MVP.

Roster

Transactions

Additions

Recruited imports

Win–loss record

References

External links
Purefoods Basketball: Purefoods Current News and Updates

Magnolia Hotshots seasons
Purefoods